Zhong Kui is a Taoist deity in Chinese mythology, traditionally regarded as a vanquisher of ghosts and evil beings. He is depicted as a large man with a big black beard, bulging eyes, and a wrathful expression. Zhong Kui is able to command 80,000 demons to do his bidding and is often associated with the five bats of fortune.  Worship and iconography of Zhong Kui later spread to other East Asian countries, and he can also be found in the folklores and mythologies of Korea, Japan, and Vietnam.

In art, Zhong Kui is a frequent subject in paintings and crafts, and his image is often painted on household gates as a guardian spirit as well as in places of business where high-value goods are involved. He is also commonly portrayed in popular media.

Becoming the king of ghosts
According to folklore, Zhong Kui travelled with Du Ping (杜平), a friend from his hometown, to take part in the state-wide imperial examinations held in the capital city Chang'an. Though Zhong Kui attained great academic success through his achievement of top honors in the major exams, his rightful title of "Zhuangyuan" (top-scorer) was stripped from him by the then emperor because of his disfigured and ugly appearance.

Extremely enraged, Zhong Kui committed suicide by continually hurling himself against the palace gates until his head was broken, whereupon Du Ping had him buried and laid to rest. During the divine judgment after his death from suicide, Yanluo Wang (the Chinese Underworld Judge) saw much potential in Zhong Kui, intelligent and smart enough to score top honors in the imperial examinations but condemned to Youdu because of the strong grievance. Yama then gave him a title as the king of ghosts and tasked him to hunt, capture, take charge of and maintain discipline and order among all ghosts.

After Zhong Kui became the king of ghosts in Hell, Zhong Kui returned to his hometown on Chinese New Year's eve. To repay Du Ping's kindness, Zhong Kui gave his younger sister in marriage to Du Ping.

Popularization in later dynasties
Zhong Kui's popularity in folklore can be traced to the reign of Emperor Xuanzong of Tang China (712 to 756). According to Song Dynasty sources, once the Emperor Xuanzong was gravely ill and had a dream in which he saw two ghosts. The smaller of the ghosts stole a purse from imperial consort Yang Guifei and a flute belonging to the emperor. The larger ghost, wearing the hat of an official, captured the smaller ghost, tore out his eye and ate it. He then introduced himself as Zhong Kui. He said that he had sworn to rid the empire of evil. When the emperor awoke, he had recovered from his illness. So he commissioned the court painter Wu Daozi to produce an image of Zhong Kui to show to the officials. This was highly influential to later representations of Zhong Kui.

Legacy 
Zhong Kui and his legend became a popular theme in later Chinese painting, art, and folklore. Pictures of Zhong Kui used to be frequently hung up in households to scare away ghosts. His character was and still is especially popular in New Year pictures.

Moreover, the popularity of Zhong Kui gives rise to the idiom "Da Gui Jie Zhong Kui" (打鬼借钟馗), which could be translated as "Borrow the name of Zhong Kui to smash the ghost", which means to finish a task by masquerading it is done for someone greater in power or status. Some argue that Mao Zedong  is the first to use this phrase.

In art
Twentieth-century painter Quan Xianguang (b. 1932) painted Zhong Kui as a burly, hairy man holding a sturdy sword in his bared right arm.

Temples
 Zhong Kui Temple in Guanqiao, Hunan
 Shuiwei Zhengwei Temple in Xizhou, Changhua
 Guang Lu Temple in Zhuqi, Chiayi
 Wu Fu Temple in Wanhua, Taipei
 Zhong Nan Old Temple, Batu Pahat, Johor
 Shōki Shrine in Higashiyama Ward, Kyoto

In popular culture

 Zhong Kui is venerated in Chinese folk religion as one of the three Lords of Demon-Subduer in Southern China region. Xuan Tian Shang Di and Guan Sheng Di Jun (Guan Yu) are the other two Lords.
 The Dance of Zhong Kui developed under the Song dynasty and was adapted into opera under the Ming. It is also a form of ritual for exorcism and purification purpose. this tradition still survives today across China, both in the north especially the Huyi District of Shaanxi and in the south especially She County of Anhui, and Taiwan. 
 Shōki is highly venerated in Japan and is still worshipped in some Shinto shrines. Shōki was also the namesake of the Imperial Japanese Army's single-engine Nakajima Ki-44 fighter plane.
 Zhong Kui (played by San Kuai) appears in the 1977 Bruceploitation film The Dragon Lives Again.
 Zhong Kui appears in the 1985 Taiwanese series New Legends of Chu Liuxiang
 Qiu Yun, the main character of Huang Shuqin's 1987 feminist film Woman, Demon, Human, is an opera singer famed for her portrayals of Zhong Kui.
 Zhong Kui (played by Huang Wenyong) appears in the 1987 Strange Encounters and its 1988 sequel Strange Encounters II.
 Zhong Kui (played by Law Lok Lam) appears in the 1988 Asia Television series The Chinese Ghostbuster.
 Zhong Kui appears in the Hong Kong comic Saint and, as Shōki, in the American comic Usagi Yojimbo.
 Zhong Kui is the main character in the 1994 Taiwanese–Singaporean television series Heavenly Master Zhong Kui (《天師鍾馗》, Tianshi Zhong Kui).
 Zhong Kui (played by Wu Ma) is the main character in the 1994 Hong Kong film The Chinese Ghostbuster.
 Zhong Kui appears as a summonable demon in the 1995 RPG Shin Megami Tensei: Devil Summoner, and other Shin Megami Tensei titles.
 Pierre DeCelles created a Zhong Kui series of paintings in 2004.
 Zhong Kui (played by Bobby Au-yeung) is the main character of the 2009 series Ghost Catcher: Legend of Beauty.
 Zhong Kui is the main character in the 2012 Hunan Television series The Legend of Zhong Kui (《鍾馗傳說》, Zhōng Kuí Chuánshuō).
 Zhong Kui (played by Chen Kun) is the main character in the 2015 movie Zhong Kui: Snow Girl and the Dark Crystal.
 Zhong Kui "the Demon Queller" is a character from the Chinese pantheon in the 2014 Hi-Rez MOBA game Smite.
 Zhong Kui in honor of kings (Wang Zhe Rong Yao)
 Zhong Kui appears as a character in the 2018 novel Voice of the Elders by Greg Ripley.
 Zhong Kui appears as a DLC character in Crytek's 2018 survival game Hunt: Showdown.
Zhong Kui appears in the 2020-2021 Taiwanese fantasy drama series The Devil Punisher.
 In the 2022 mobile game Dislyte'', Zhong Nan is an Epic Esper with the powers of Zhong Kui.

See also
 Cheng Huang Gong, Chinese City God
 Chinese numismatic charm
 Fulu
 Hei Bai Wu Chang, Chinese constables of underworld
 Imperial examination in Chinese mythology
 Kui in Chinese mythology
 Menshen, Chinese Door Gods
 The Five Poisons
 Yanluo Wang, Chinese Underworld Judge

References

External links

Chinese gods
Underworld gods